Dan Golden is a composer and film maker. Golden and fellow producer Daniel Sousa were nominated for an Academy Award for Best Animated Short Film for the film Feral at the 2014 Academy Awards. Golden is a 1994 alumnus of the Rhode Island School of Design.

References

External links
 Dan Golden's official website
 

American film directors
Rhode Island School of Design alumni
Living people
Year of birth missing (living people)
Place of birth missing (living people)